Haitham El Hossainy Awad (born 15 August 1977) is an Egyptian judoka.

Achievements

References

1977 births
Living people
Egyptian male judoka
Judoka at the 2000 Summer Olympics
Judoka at the 2004 Summer Olympics
Olympic judoka of Egypt
African Games silver medalists for Egypt
African Games medalists in judo
African Games bronze medalists for Egypt
Mediterranean Games bronze medalists for Egypt
Mediterranean Games medalists in judo
Competitors at the 1999 All-Africa Games
Competitors at the 2007 All-Africa Games
Competitors at the 2001 Mediterranean Games